Fadi Mohammad al-Batsh was a Palestinian engineer, academic and member of Hamas. He was assassinated on 21 April 2018 in Kuala Lumpur, Malaysia, while heading to a mosque for dawn prayers.

Biography
While living in Gaza, he was employed by the Energy Authority and was a resident of Jabalia city.
He received a PhD in electrical engineering from the University of Malaya in 2015 and during the course of his study, published 18 scholarly pieces of research featured in a number of international journals. In 2016 he received an award from the Malaysian treasury. Fadi was also an imam and involved with Islamic organizations such as MyCARE.

Al-Batsh was a lecturer in electrical engineering at the Universiti Kuala Lumpur British-Malaysian-Institute (UniKL BMI). He had been living in Malaysia since 2011.

Assassination
On 21 April 2018, he was shot dead by two gunmen on a motorcycle on a street in Kuala Lumpur, Malaysia. His family has accused Mossad of being responsible for the killing but Israel has denied any involvement in the assassination.

Reactions
Hamas chief Ismail Haniyeh called his killing a "terrible crime" and attributed it to Mossad. Batsh's uncle Jamal al-Batsh also blamed "The Israeli Mossad", claiming that they  stood behind the assassination of educated people and intellectuals because Israel "knows Palestine will be liberated by scientists."

Israeli Defence Minister Avigdor Lieberman said "The man was no saint and he didn’t deal with improving infrastructure in Gaza - he was involved in improving rockets’ accuracy ... We constantly see a settling of accounts between various factions in the terrorist organizations and I suppose that is what happened in this case."

Malaysian Home Minister Ahmad Zahid Hamidi said Fadi was "believed to have become a liability for a country hostile to Palestine".

Humanitarian Care Malaysia (MyCARE) chairman Associate Professor Dr Hafidzi Mohd Noor said Fadi was an expert in renewable energy sources, especially in regards to generator engineering. “Since news of his killing broke, all sorts of sensational news regarding Fadi has come out, including allegations in foreign media that he was an expert in making rockets and drones. Such news is absolutely not true.“  “Fadi was a man who loved peace... why would he take the risk of putting himself, his family and other Palestinians here in Malaysia at risk by getting involved in arms manufacturing, as proposed (by foreign media)?” Hafidzi further stated that Fadi had an excellent professional and academic record in the field of renewable energy and had dreamed of contributing to the development of Palestine. “We don’t deny the possibility that his achievements and his capabilities had perhaps made him a target for Israeli Zionists. In fact, before this he had mentioned his worry that he would be attacked by Apache helicopter gunships back in Palestine, and mentioned that 18 members of his extended family had been killed in Gaza in 2009 alone.“

Personal life
Fadi was married and has three children.

See also
 Nidal Fat'hi Rabah Farahat
 Operation Wooden Leg
 Khalil al-Wazir
 Salah Khalaf

References

1983 births
2018 deaths
Hamas members
Assassinated Hamas members
Assassinated Palestinian people
University of Malaya alumni
People from Jabalia
Palestinian electrical engineers